Bukhta-Ilicha (also, Bukhta-Il’icha) is a village in Baku, Azerbaijan.

References 

Populated places in Baku